Cornell Iral Haynes Jr. (born November 2, 1974), better known by his stage name Nelly, is an American rapper and singer. Raised in St. Louis, he embarked on his musical career with the southern hip hop group St. Lunatics in 1993 and signed to Universal Records in 1999. Under Universal, Nelly began his solo career in the year 2000, with his commercial debut album Country Grammar, of which the featured title track and the single "Ride wit Me" were top 10 hits. The album peaked at number one on the US Billboard 200 chart, and became Nelly's best-selling album to date, selling over 8.4 million copies in the United States. His following album Nellyville produced the number-one hits "Hot in Herre" and "Dilemma" (featuring Kelly Rowland), along with the top five single "Air Force Ones" (featuring Murphy Lee and St. Lunatics).

With the same-day dual release of Sweat and Suit (2004) and the compilation Sweatsuit (2006), Nelly continued to generate many chart-topping hits. Sweat debuted at number two on the US Billboard 200 chart, selling 342,000 copies in its first week. In the same week of release, Suit debuted at number one, selling around 396,000 copies in its first week on the same chart. Nelly's fifth studio album, Brass Knuckles, was released in 2008 after several delays. It produced the singles "Party People" (featuring Fergie), "Stepped on My J'z" (featuring Jermaine Dupri and Ciara) and "Body on Me" (featuring Akon and Ashanti). In 2010, Nelly released the album 5.0. The lead single, "Just a Dream", was certified triple platinum by the Recording Industry Association of America (RIAA); it also spawned the singles "Move That Body" (featuring T-Pain and Akon) and "Gone" (featuring Kelly Rowland).

Nelly has won multiple accolades throughout his career including three Grammy Awards and nine Billboard Music Awards. In 2005, he starred in the remake film The Longest Yard, alongside Adam Sandler and Chris Rock. He has two clothing lines, Vokal and Apple Bottoms. He has been referred to by Peter Shapiro as "one of the biggest stars of the new millennium", and as of 2014, Nelly was ranked as the fourth-best-selling rap artist in American music history, according to the RIAA, with 21 million albums sold in the United States. In December 2009, Billboard ranked Nelly the number three Top Artist of the Decade (2000s).

Life and career

1974–2000: Early life and career beginnings 
Nelly was born Cornell Iral Haynes Jr. in Austin, Texas, the only son of Cornell Haynes and Rhonda Mack. His father served in the Air Force for much of his childhood and, when he was seven, his parents divorced. As a teenager, Haynes moved with his mother from St. Louis to University City, a St. Louis County suburb. While in high school, Nelly formed the St. Lunatics with his friends Ali, Murphy Lee, Kyjuan, Slo Down, and his half brother City Spud. The group enjoyed moderate local popularity with their single "Gimme What Ya Got" in 1996. Despite being popular in Missouri and the surrounding areas, the group struggled to achieve success outside of St. Louis. The rest of the group agreed to let Nelly go solo after a major record deal failed to appear. Later in 1999, Nelly was signed to Universal Music Group by A&R Kevin Law. Law told HitQuarters that Nelly was largely disliked by the label when he first signed, with the feedback he received from his colleagues on the rapper's music being "extraordinarily negative". Nelly was unusual for being a rapper from the Midwest at a time when hip-hop was dominated by the East Coast, West Coast and the South. The label used this to their advantage by branding Nelly as a star of the Midwest, hoping to inspire pride in the people of St Louis and the surrounding regions. Despite the negative feedback he received from the label, Nelly's debut single, "Country Grammar (Hot Shit)", was a success, peaking at number 7 on both the Billboard Hot 100 and UK singles chart. Recognizing Nelly's potential, the label began to change their mind and allowed work to begin on his debut album. The label decided to do a solo record with Nelly first and then reunite him with the St. Lunatics the following year.

2000–2003: Breakthrough with Country Grammar and Nellyville 
The label released his debut album, Country Grammar, in 2000. The success of its title track as a single (number 7 on the Hot 100 and No. 1 Hot Rap Tracks) led to the album debuting at number three in the Billboard 200 in the U.S. Other singles from the album included "E.I."; "Ride wit Me", featuring City Spud; and "Batter Up", featuring the St. Lunatics. The album was certified 9× platinum by the RIAA on April 27, 2004. Nelly performed as a special guest in the Super Bowl XXXV halftime show.

In 2002, Nelly's second album, Nellyville, was released, debuting at No. 1 on Billboard's Top 200 Music Albums; its lead single "Hot in Herre" was a number-one hit. Other singles included "Dilemma", which featured Kelly Rowland and sold over 7.6 million records worldwide, "Work It" featuring Justin Timberlake, "Air Force Ones" featuring Murphy Lee and the St. Lunatics, "Pimp Juice", and "#1". This album was highly successful and was certified 6x multi-platinum on June 27, 2003. "Hot in Herre" won the Grammy Award for Best Male Rap Solo Performance in 2003. In 2003, Nelly released Da Derrty Versions: The Reinvention, which featured the hit single "Iz U" from the soundtrack to Walt Disney's The Haunted Mansion. The music video of a Tip Drill Remix became a source of controversy due to perceptions of misogynistic depictions of women. The controversy forced Nelly to cancel an appearance at a bone marrow drive at Spelman College, a historically black college in Atlanta. Similar claims of misogyny also surrounded Nelly's single "Pimp Juice". RIAA have certified the album Platinum. For the Bad Boys II soundtrack album, Nelly contributed the single "Shake Ya Tailfeather" featuring Diddy and Murphy Lee. Another number-one hit, "Shake Ya Tailfeather", won the 2004 Grammy Award for Best Rap Performance by a Duo or Group.

2004–2008: Continued success, Sweat, Suit and Brass Knuckles 
Nelly performed in the Super Bowl XXXVIII halftime show, his second time performing in a Super Bowl halftime show.

On September 14, 2004, Nelly released two albums, Sweat and Suit. Suit, an R&B-oriented album, debuted at number one on the Billboard albums chart, and Sweat, a rap-oriented album, debuted at number two. From Suit, the slow ballad "Over and Over", an unlikely duet with country music star Tim McGraw, became a crossover hit. On the 2004 NBC television concert special Tim McGraw: Here and Now, McGraw and Nelly performed the song. A feud with another St. Louis-based rapper, Chingy, came up near the end of the year. Tsunami Aid: A Concert for Hope, a 2004 Indian Ocean earthquake benefit concert special produced by NBC, featured Nelly. In the winter of 2005 came Sweatsuit, a compilation of tracks from Sweat and Suit with three new tracks. "Grillz", produced by Jermaine Dupri, was a number-one hit. To date both albums have sold over 5 million units in the United States.

Brass Knuckles was released on September 16, 2008, after several delays. Initial release dates for the album targeted October 16 and November 13. Its original lead single was "Wadsyaname", a ballad-oriented track produced by Ron "NEFF-U" Feemstar and sampling the piano riff from "All My Life" by K-Ci & JoJo. Nelly later confirmed that "Wadsyaname" was never going to be on Brass Knuckles. Nelly recorded "Party People", featuring Fergie and produced by Polow da Don, which turned out to be his first official single off the album. "Stepped on My J'z" was the next single, produced by Jermaine Dupri and featuring Dupri and Ciara; following that was "Body on Me", produced by Akon and featuring Akon and Ashanti. Nelly appeared on Rick Ross's third single, "Here I Am", which also featured label mate Avery Storm.

2009–2010: Collaborations and 5.0 

In the summer of 2009, Nelly made a public announcement in Las Vegas about the yet-to-be-titled album. In October 2009, Nelly did an interview with SOHH.com and said that the album was going to be released sometime in 2010. In an interview with Semtex TV, Nelly told reporters that he planned to release the album under the name Nelly. In April 2010, Nelly's cousin Michael Johnson was murdered in Missouri, Nelly said that he delayed releasing the album because of this. Guests featured on the album were, T-Pain, Chris Brown, Akon, Plies, T.I., Kelly Rowland, Birdman, DJ Khaled, Avery Storm and Diddy-Dirty Money. In May 2010, Nelly confirmed that the title of the album was 5.0. The album was released on November 16, 2010. The album's lead single "Just a Dream" was released on August 17, 2010, through iTunes along with the promotional single "Tippin' in da Club". The two songs were released to Mainstream and Rhythm/Crossover radio on August 10, 2010. "Just a Dream" made its first chart appearance debuting on the US Billboard Hot 100 at number 12 and peaking at number 3 in its fourth week. The song also debuted at number 3 on the Billboard Digital Songs chart, selling 888,000 downloads in its first week. "Just a Dream" is Nelly's highest-charting song since his 2005 single "Grillz" and debuted at number 7 on the Billboard Rap Songs. The song entered the Canadian Hot 100 in August 2010, at number 32 It debuted in Australia (ARIA Charts) on the Singles Chart at number 3, in New Zealand Singles Charts at number 29, and in Switzerland (Media Control AG) at number 52. The second single "Move That Body", which features T-Pain and Akon, was released on October 12, 2010. The song made its first chart appearance debuting on the US Billboard Hot 100 at number 54 and has reached a current peak at number 29 in Australia. Nelly is featured on the second single by singer Mohombi entitled "Miss Me", produced by RedOne. On November 13, 2010, Nelly appeared on the Pacquiao vs. Margarito pay-per-view, at the Cowboys Stadium in Arlington, Texas. "Gone" is the sequel to Nelly's 2002 worldwide number-one single "Dilemma", also with Rowland, and serves as third single from Nelly's album.

2011–2014: M.O. and The Next: Fame Is at Your Doorstep 

In June 2011, Pitbull released a song off the deluxe version of the album Planet Pit featuring Nelly titled "My Kinda Girl".

In December 2011, Nelly released his first ever official solo mixtape, entitled O.E.MO, which stands for "On Everything MO". The mixtape features guest appearances from T.I., 2 Chainz, Bei Maejor, St. Lunatics and more.

In August 2012, Nelly became a coach on The CW's The Next: Fame Is at Your Doorstep along with Gloria Estefan, John Rich and Joe Jonas. Nelly released his second mixtape, entitled Scorpio Season, on November 2, 2012.

In February 2013, Nelly released "Hey Porsche", the lead single from his seventh studio album M.O. The song peaked at number 42 on the Billboard Hot 100 and hit the top ten in Australia, Ireland, New Zealand and the United Kingdom. In April 2013, a remix of "Cruise", the breakthrough single of country music duo Florida Georgia Line, featuring Nelly, was released. Nelly's next single "Get Like Me" featuring Nicki Minaj and Pharrell was released on iTunes on July 2, 2013.

The album M.O. was released on September 30, 2013, by Republic Records.

2014–present: Television series and Heartland 
From 2014 to 2015, Nelly starred in the reality TV show Nellyville, which ran for two seasons. The series aired on BET and is about Nelly's music and acting career and raising his four children.

On August 6, 2015, Nelly premiered the single "The Fix", which was released on his own label, "RECORDS". In an interview with Big Boy, Nelly stated that there may or may not be a new album following his new music.

As of 2018, Nelly is signed to Columbia Records.

In 2020, he released the song "Lil Bit", a collaboration with Florida Georgia Line from his "country-influenced" album titled Heartland. He also joined country singers Kane Brown and Brett Kissel for remixes of their songs, "Cool Again" and "She Drives Me Crazy".

Film and television career
Nelly's film debut came in 2001 in the independent film Snipes playing a famous rapper named Prolifik. He starred in the 2005 remake of The Longest Yard with Adam Sandler and Chris Rock. The movie's soundtrack includes his songs "Errtime" and "Fly Away". In June 2008, in an interview with Kiwibox, Nelly revealed that he is reluctant to continue his acting career, noting that he does not want to "take away from the culture of acting." In 2008 and 2009, Nelly appeared in episodes of the CBS crime drama CSI: NY. In 2011, he made a cameo appearance on 90210. From 2014 to 2015, he appeared in his own reality TV show, Nellyville, based on the title of his second studio album, which is about his career and raising his four kids. The show ran for two seasons. From 2013 to 2016, Nelly was in the main cast of the mockumentary series Real Husbands of Hollywood.

On September 2, 2020, Nelly was announced as one of the celebrities competing on the 29th season of Dancing with the Stars. He and partner Daniella Karagach would end up finishing in third place.

Artistry

Nelly's rapping style has been described by Peter Shapiro as using "unforgettable hooks based on schoolyard songs, double-dutch chants, and nonsense rhymes" and has a "Missouri twang". AllMusic suggests Nelly's style is based largely on where he comes from: "Nelly's locale certainly informs his rapping style, which is as much country as urban, and his dialect as well, which is as much Southern drawl as Midwestern twang". Nelly explains his method of writing in the book How to Rap, describing how he freestyles most of the lyrics before going back over them to "make it a little tighter", he generally writes in the studio rather than at home, he normally comes up with a chorus for a song before writing the verses, and he likes to write to the music he will be rapping over. AllMusic also notes his "tongue-twisting" hooks, which are also often sung rather than rapped.

Other ventures 

Nike and Nelly agreed on a one-year deal in 2003 to release a limited-edition sneaker called the "Air Derrty", which was a retro remake of Charles Barkley's signature sneaker. Nelly later signed a shoe deal with Reebok. Nelly has done ads for Got Milk? and the Ford Motor Company. His energy drink Pimp Juice sold one million cans during the first two months after its introduction in August 2003, and was criticized for its name by black consumer activists. Nelly owns Apple Bottoms, a female clothing line, and Vokal, which caters to men. He was one of the owners of the Charlotte Bobcats, along with Robert L. Johnson and Michael Jordan until Jordan became the new owner in March 2010.

Nelly has played the Main Event at the 2007 World Series of Poker. He has also played The PokerStars European Poker Tour and PokerStars Caribbean Adventure. In August 2010, Nelly started a temporary stint as the afternoon host on WHHL HOT 104.1 in St. Louis. He is taking the place of regular PM drive personality, Stacy Static, who is on pregnancy leave.

In September 2010, Nelly released a fitness DVD entitled Celebrity Sweat, walking viewers through various exercises and weight training techniques.

In 2011, he and Vatterott College worked together to found the Ex'treme Institute By Nelly, which is a music production school in the heart of St. Louis.

In 2015, Nelly teamed up with Mike and Ike candy after a halt in collaborating a year earlier. He and the owners of Mike and Ike released a movie trailer the same day titled "The Return of Mike and Ike" describing the split and reunion.

In 2021, Nelly collaborated with Burger King on the "Cornell Haynes, Jr. Meal", part of a line of celebrity-themed meals that the establishment created to promote its "Keep It Real Meals" in recognition of their removal of 120 artificial ingredients from its menu items. The meal included a Whopper, small fries and a small Sprite.

Philanthropy 
Nelly runs the non-profit organization 4Sho4Kids Foundation. The Jes Us 4 Jackie campaign began in March 2003 by Nelly and his sister Jackie Donahue after Donahue was diagnosed with leukemia. The campaign attempts to educate African Americans and other minorities about the need for bone marrow transplants, and to register more donors. Donahue died of leukemia on March 24, 2005, almost two years after the campaign began.

In 2006, Nelly started hosting a “White and Black Ball” in his hometown of St. Louis as a fundraiser to collect funds for scholarships. He has sent two students to college every year for over a decade, and set up a scholarship fund named after Michael Brown was shot and killed.

In 2010, Nelly endorsed Do Something's Tackle Hunger campaign. In a public service announcement he filmed for the cause, Nelly challenged teens to fight hunger by collecting one million pounds of food for the holiday season.

Legal issues

Misdemeanor drug-offense conviction (2015)
In April 2015, the Tennessee Highway Patrol conducted a traffic stop of Nelly's Prevost tour bus because of non-conforming U.S. Department of Transportation and International Fuel Tax Association stickers. Nelly was one of six people on board. After a state trooper said that he smelled marijuana, the troopers searched the bus and said that they found drug paraphernalia and marijuana, as well as a substance that they initially believed to be methamphetamine and several handguns. Nelly was initially booked into the Putnam County Jail and was released on bail.

Nelly was initially charged with felony drug possession, simple possession of marijuana and possession of drug paraphernalia. However, after further testing proved that the seized substance was not methamphetamine, the felony charge was dropped. In December 2015, the case was resolved when Nelly pleaded guilty to misdemeanor possession of marijuana and misdemeanor possession of drug paraphernalia and was sentenced to one year of probation. Nelly entered a diversion program, in which the misdemeanor convictions were cleared from his record after 11 months.

Tax lien (2016)
In 2016, it was reported that there was a $2.4 million tax lien against Nelly due to unpaid taxes owed to the IRS.

Rape arrest (2017)
On October 7, 2017, Nelly was arrested in Auburn, Washington, outside Seattle, on suspicion of second-degree rape after a woman alleged that he invited her onto his tour bus earlier that morning and raped her. Nelly was booked into a Des Moines, Washington, jail, and released from custody without charge. Nelly denied wrongdoing; his attorney said that the accusation was "clearly false". On December 14, it was revealed Nelly would not be charged in the case because the alleged victim declined to cooperate. Nelly also filed a countersuit claiming defamation.  Both lawsuits were dropped after the parties reached a settlement in 2018.

By the end of January 2018, Nelly was again accused of sexual assault after a gig at the Cliffs Pavilion in Essex, England at the end of 2017. There was also an additional allegation of assault reported at the time. It was reported in 2019 that Nelly had reached a settlement with the woman in Essex.

Discography 

Studio albums
 Country Grammar (2000)
 Nellyville (2002)
 Sweat (2004)
 Suit (2004)
 Brass Knuckles (2008)
 5.0 (2010)
 M.O. (2013)
 Heartland (2021)

Filmography

References

External links

 
 
 

 
1974 births
Living people
20th-century American rappers
21st-century American male actors
21st-century American rappers
African-American businesspeople
African-American investors
African-American male actors
African-American male rappers
African-American record producers
African-American sports executives and administrators
American businesspeople in retailing
American drink industry businesspeople
American fashion businesspeople
American hip hop record producers
American hip hop singers
American investors
American male film actors
American male television actors
American nonprofit businesspeople
American philanthropists
American sports executives and administrators
Businesspeople from St. Louis
Businesspeople from Texas
Charlotte Bobcats owners
Culture of St. Louis
Grammy Award winners for rap music
Male actors from St. Louis
Male actors from Texas
Musicians from Austin, Texas
People from St. Louis County, Missouri
Pop rappers
Rappers from Austin
Rappers from St. Louis
Rappers from Texas
Record producers from Missouri
Record producers from Texas
Republic Records artists
Shoe designers
St. Lunatics members
Universal Records artists
Universal Motown Records artists
World Music Awards winners